Misha Mansoor (born October 31, 1984), also known as Bulb after the name of his solo project, is an American musician, best known as the founder of and one of the three guitarists in the progressive metal band Periphery. He is also a part of the projects Haunted Shores and Four Seconds Ago, and Of Man, Not of Machine.

Mansoor is considered to be one of the forerunners of the djent movement and is often erroneously attributed with the invention of the word itself (whose invention he attributes to Meshuggah guitarist Fredrik Thordendal). With Periphery, Mansoor has recorded, produced, and released seven studio albums: a self-titled debut, Periphery II: This Time It's Personal, Juggernaut: Alpha, Juggernaut: Omega, Periphery III: Select Difficulty, Periphery IV: Hail Stan, and Periphery V: Djent Is Not a Genre. Mansoor has been named one of the Top 20 best guitarists of the 2010s by Guitar World magazine.

Early life 
Mansoor was born on October 31, 1984, to Ali Mansoor, an economist associated with World Bank who served a term as Secretary to the Minister of Finance in Mauritius. Mansoor is Mauritian by descent but was born and raised in the US. He is also Jewish and can speak French. Mansoor attended the University of Toronto, originally majoring in sociology before switching to philosophy, eventually dropping out to pursue his passion for music.

Career

Bulb (2004–present) 
Mansoor first seriously started writing and producing music when at college at the University of Toronto. It was here that he and a friend decided to form a band called Bulb, and started posting demos to SoundClick in 2004. While the project ultimately did not work out and the friendship faded, Mansoor adopted the name Bulb as his online alias and continued to post demos to the Bulb SoundClick account. Mansoor would regularly post his music to the Meshuggah, John Petrucci SevenString.org, Andy Sneap Ultimate Metal online forums. Eventually, Mansoor's reputation as a songwriter and a music producer in the metal scene began to grow. After Mansoor founded Periphery in 2005, he would often transfer songs between the two projects. With the international success of Periphery, Mansoor still continued to release demos and new music under the Bulb name, but at a lesser frequency than before. In May 2013, Mansoor announced that he would be working on his first solo album, which would be written, performed and produced entirely by himself.

Starting June 2020, Mansoor released all of the Bulb Material in his Archives, a set of 10 albums that would be released bi-weekly, starting with the newest Bulb material and going back to the oldest, with 2 of the albums being filled with purely orchestral and electronic music. Mansoor has also announced that he is currently working on his long-awaited Bulb solo album, which is due in 2021.

On May 14, 2021, Mansoor released the single "Parabolica", along with its accompanying music video, and announced that the Bulb solo album, titled Moderately Fast, Adequately Furious, will be released on July 16, 2021, via 3DOT Recordings. Mansoor, an avid racing fan, named the track "Parabolica" as a reference to the Curva Parabolica turn on the Monza Circuit in Milan, Italy.

Periphery (2005–present) 

Mansoor formed Periphery in 2005, originally starting out on drums for the band before transitioning to guitar. Periphery went through numerous lineup changes before settling on a lineup of Mansoor, Jake Bowen, and Alex Bois on guitar, Matt Halpern on drums, Tom Murphy on bass, and Spencer Sotelo on vocals. Periphery released their self-titled debut album in 2010 to critical acclaim. In 2011, Bois and Murphy left the band, eventually being replaced with Mark Holcomb and Adam "Nolly" Getgood, solidifying the core Periphery lineup. Periphery went on to release six more studio albums (Periphery II: This Time It's Personal, Juggernaut: Alpha, Juggernaut: Omega, Periphery III: Select Difficulty, Periphery IV: Hail Stan, and Periphery V: Djent Is Not a Genre) and two EPs (Icarus and Clear), all to critical and commercial success.

Haunted Shores (2009–present) 
In 2009, Mansoor joined the Mark Holcomb-led project Haunted Shores, with the project eventually evolving into solely being the duo of Holcomb and Mansoor. In 2010, Haunted Shores released its first set of new music with Mansoor on a split EP with Cyclamen. The project went on unannounced hiatus from 2010–2017, but became active again with the release of the Viscera EP, with features from Jørgen Munkeby and Devin Townsend.

Four Seconds Ago (2018–present) 
In 2018, Mansoor formed the electronic side project Four Seconds Ago with fellow Periphery guitarist Jake Bowen. Their debut album The Vacancy was released in 2018.

Of Man Not of Machine (2008–2011, 2016–present) 
Mansoor, along with current Periphery and then-Haunted Shores guitarist Mark Holcomb and current Good Tiger and former TesseracT and then-Sky Eats Airplane lead singer Elliot Coleman founded a side project called "Of Man Not of Machine" (abbreviated OMNOM) that released music from 2008–2011. The project became inactive due to Coleman joining TesseracT in 2011 and with Holcomb and Mansoor finding further success with Periphery with the release of Periphery II: This Time It's Personal. Mansoor and Coleman occasionally began posting small clips of the two writing new OMNOM material to Instagram since 2016, however no releases were announced or made. In April 2022, Periphery drummer and bandmate Matt Halpern released a drum playthrough video for Meinl Cymbals titled "OMNOM Demo 1", officially showcasing a brand new OMNOM song.

Snuggles (2011) 
In 2011, Mansoor and then-Periphery bandmate Adam "Nolly" Getgood released a set of 3 hardcore punk-themed songs under the side project name Snuggles. The project is currently inactive.

Other work 
Mansoor and Steve Vai were selected to contribute the Halo 2 Anniversary Original Soundtrack. Mansoor was also selected to contribute to the soundtrack of Destiny: Rise of Iron.

Mansoor's career as a producer started when he produced and co-wrote the Animals as Leaders' debut self-titled album and since then he has produced bands such as Veil of Maya, Born of Osiris, Being and Stray from the Path. He formed a production company called Top Secret Audio in 2013 with Adam "Nolly" Getgood, his former Periphery bandmate. Mansoor also has produced or helped to produce every one of Periphery's studio albums.

Business ventures 
Mansoor, along with Periphery members Matt Halpern and Adam "Nolly" Getgood and Good Tiger guitarist Derya Nagle founded the company GetGood Drums (abbreviated GGD), in 2016, with the company name being a pun on Nolly's last name. GGD's primary product focus is amplifier simulation plugins, drum libraries, and drum groove packs. Mansoor regularly composes the music for GGD demos as well as posts video playthroughs of the demos.

In 2016, Mansoor founded Horizon Devices, a guitar pedal and gear company, with friends Mehtab Bhogal and Brian Gilmanov. Horizon Devices has released many guitar pedals and accessories such as strings and picks and is endorsed by artists such as Yvette Young, Ola Englund, and Keith Merrow.

Mansoor is a partner in 3DOT Recordings, along with Periphery bandmates Spencer Sotelo, Jake Bowen, Mark Holcomb and Matt Halpern. The label releases material created by Periphery, all of its associated side projects, and third party bands signed to the label.

Mansoor, along with all of his Periphery bandmates, run a merchandise line called Bottom Ramen. Mansoor also has a partnership with Joey Sturgis Tones and has his own signature plugin Toneforge Misha Mansoor.

Equipment

Guitars 
Mansoor currently is a signature artist for Jackson Guitars, with his signature USA-made Juggernaut HT6 and HT7 guitars having first been released in 2015. Mansoor also regularly uses a relic Stratocaster made by the Jackson LA custom shop. In 2017, Mansoor and Jackson released his more affordable Indonesian-made version of the Juggernauts for the Jackson Pro Series line, and in 2021 Mansoor and Jackson released a Japanese-made version of Mansoor's custom relic So-Cal/Stratocaster as a part of the Jackson MJ line. Before being a Jackson signature artist, Mansoor used guitars by Mayones, Ibanez, Ernie Ball Music Man, Blackmachine, Strandberg, and various other brands.

Mansoor is also a signature artist for Bare Knuckle Pickups, with his signature Juggernaut and Ragnarok Sets having been released in 2013 and 2017, respectively.

Amplifiers 
Mansoor is a signature artist for Peavey Electronics, with his signature 120 Watt Invective amplifier head being introduced in 2017 and a 25 Watt mini version (the MH) being released in 2019. Mansoor also extensively uses the Fractal Audio Axe-Fx amplifier modeler for studio use and touring. Mansoor also uses amps by EVH, Friedman, Mesa/Boogie, and various other companies.

Personal life 
Mansoor is an avid motorsport and F1 fan, and regularly posts pictures of his car collection, which include a McLaren 765LT Spider, a 991.2 Porsche 911 GT3 Touring, and a Subaru BRZ. Mansoor is Jewish.

Influences 
Mansoor cites several musicians as influences from a wide range of genres. Notably, he cites John Petrucci, Allan Holdsworth, Ron Jarzombek and Fredrik Thordendal as being important to his development as a guitar player. Other notable artists and bands include Meshuggah, Devin Townsend, Nevermore, Guthrie Govan, Opeth, Gojira, Porcupine Tree and Textures.

Discography

With Periphery 
 Periphery (2010)
 Icarus EP (2011)
 Periphery II: This Time It's Personal (2012)
 Clear (2014)
 Juggernaut: Alpha (2015)
 Juggernaut: Omega (2015)
 Periphery III: Select Difficulty (2016)
 Periphery IV: Hail Stan (2019)
 Periphery V: Djent Is Not a Genre (2023)

As Bulb 
 Archives: Volume 1 (2020)
 Archives: Volume 2 (2020)
 Archives: Volume 3 (2020)
 Archives: Volume 4 (2020)
 Archives: Volume 5 (2020)
 Archives: Volume 6 (2020)
 Archives: Volume 7 (2020)
 Archives: Volume 8 (2020)
 Archives: Orchestral (2020)
 Archives: Electronic (2020)
 Moderately Fast, Adequately Furious (2021)

With Haunted Shores 
 Split EP with Cyclamen (2010)
 Viscera (2015)
 Void (2022)

With Four Seconds Ago 
 The Vacancy (2018)

As a producer/songwriter 
 Stray from the Path – Make Your Own History (2009)
 Animals as Leaders – Animals as Leaders (2009)
 Sol Asunder – Mechanize (2009)
 An Obscure Signal – Creations EP (2010)
 Veil of Maya – Eclipse (2012)
 Animals as Leaders – The Joy of Motion (2014)
 Volumes – No Sleep (2014)
 "Breaking the Covenant" and "Follow in Flight" on Halo 2 Anniversary Original Soundtrack (2014)
 For Mankind (Credits Theme) – Deus Ex: Mankind Divided (Original Soundtrack) (2016)
 Animals as Leaders –  Parrhesia (2022)

References 

Living people
Progressive metal guitarists
1984 births
Seven-string guitarists
Periphery members
American people of Mauritian descent
Jewish American musicians
Jewish heavy metal musicians
21st-century guitarists
American people of Indian descent
21st-century American Jews